Paul Temple is a British-German television series which originally aired on BBC1 between 1969 and 1971. 52 episodes were made over four seasons, each episode having a running time of around 50 minutes.

Overview
Paul Temple features Francis Matthews (1927–2014) as Paul Temple, the fictional detective created by Francis Durbridge, who solves crimes with the assistance of his wife Steve (Ros Drinkwater). Season 1 of the Paul Temple television series was produced solely by the BBC, with all 13 episodes set in Great Britain. The first episode was transmitted in November 1969, becoming one of the first shows to be broadcast in colour on BBC1.

Starting with Season 2, Paul Temple became a co-production by the BBC and Taurus Films of Munich, West Germany, and was shown internationally, with many of the episodes using overseas locations in West Germany, France, Malta and elsewhere. During the production of the second season, the producer Peter Bryant successfully persuaded Derrick Sherwin, at short notice, to join him on Paul Temple from the BBC series Doctor Who, on which they had previously worked together. There was some disagreement between the BBC and Taurus over the casting of Steve Temple (who had been played in the radio series of Paul Temple from 1945 to 1968 by Marjorie Westbury): the BBC wished to drop Ros Drinkwater from the role, but Taurus favoured her retention.

According to Francis Matthews, both Paul and Steve Temple became fashion icons of sorts, creating a style that was to be imitated in ITV's The Persuaders!, while, in America, Ros Drinkwater's role was reportedly emulated by Susan Saint James in McMillan & Wife and Stefanie Powers in Hart to Hart. According to Matthews, Drinkwater chose her own "very expensive" designer clothes for the part.

The series was intended to run for five years, but despite its popularity, especially in West Germany, the BBC withdrew prematurely after two. Huw Wheldon, the BBC's managing director for television, later explained to Matthews that it was really "Lew Grade territory" and cited the BBC's preference for such historical dramas as The Six Wives of Henry VIII and Elizabeth R. The series was allowed to peter out, the final episodes at least of the last season all based in Great Britain.

Archive
The BBC never repeated Paul Temple. The series suffered badly in the BBC's wiping policy of the 1970s. Of the 52 episodes of Paul Temple that were made, only 16 survive. 11 of the surviving 16 episodes exist in colour, and these were re-run on UK Gold in its formative years in the 1990s. The other five episodes only survive as black and white telerecordings. The loss of Paul Temple episodes was such that, of the first two seasons, only one episode exists ("Games People Play", 19 April 1970). That episode was made completely on film and therefore was archived in the BBC's Film Library. Videotapes of 25 episodes from the first two seasons were wiped. The only telerecordings that are known to exist are the last five episodes of season 4, which are in black and white.

The visuals of some of the 36 missing episodes survive in the ZDF TV archives in Germany. These come from seasons 2 to 4, which were BBC-ZDF co-produced; however, they only have dubbed German soundtracks. Any BBC tape copies of missing episodes with their original English soundtracks intact are believed to be long-gone from the ZDF archive, with one exception (see below).

In 2016, a DVD was released in Germany containing most episodes from the fourth and final season, with German dubbing. The final five episodes were included in colour, containing both the dubbed German and original English soundtracks. While not every episode on the release contains its original English language soundtrack, one, "A Family Affair", does. "A Family Affair" does not appear to have been returned to the BBC archive, for it was not included on the Acorn DVD releases in the UK.

DVD releases
In July 2009, Acorn Media released the 11 existing colour episodes (still held within the BBC archives) on DVD. These were cleared at the BBFC on 17 March 2009. In April 2012, Acorn Media released a DVD of the final five episodes. Although broadcast in colour, these five episodes were released in black and white, due to the BBC archive only having access to black-and-white copies of those episodes. Colour copies of the last five episodes do exist in an archive in Germany, and were released on DVD in Germany in 2016. However, Acorn Media did not use these recordings for the 2012 DVD release in the UK, instead relying on the BBC's monochrome copies. In August 2013, Acorn Media released all 16 of its previously issued episodes (11 in colour, five in black and white) on DVD, in a release titled Paul Temple: The Complete Collection.

In May 2016, the series began to appear in German-speaking countries, released by German DVD company Fernsehjuwelen (the name means 'TV jewels'). These DVD releases cover all the episodes of seasons 2 and 3 and most episodes from season 4, across three different boxsets. Many episodes from seasons 2–4 that are lost from the BBC's own archive still survive in German archives, and many of these episodes are made commercially available for the first time on these DVD boxsets, albeit with dubbed German audio only.

Main cast
 Francis Matthews ...  Paul Temple 
 Ros Drinkwater ...  Steve Temple 
 June Ellis ...  Kate Balfour 
 George Sewell ...  Sammy Carson
 Blake Butler ...  Eric
 Derek Martin ...  Paddy

Episodes

Season 1

Season 2

Season 3

Season 4

References

http://www.mediagems.de/01filmtv/temple_engl.html

External links
 
The Francis Durbridge Homepage: The Paul Temple TV Series (German)
English subtitles for German Paul Temple Episodes

BBC television dramas
1969 British television series debuts
1971 British television series endings
1960s British drama television series
1970s British drama television series
German crime television series
1960s British crime television series
1970s British crime television series
Lost BBC episodes